Ruta del Centro  is a professional staged cycling race held annually in Mexico. It has been part of the UCI America Tour in category 2.2 since 2013.

Winners

References

Cycle races in Mexico
UCI America Tour races
Recurring sporting events established in 2011
2011 establishments in Mexico
Spring (season) events in Mexico